This Is Nightlive (also referred to as Nightlive) was an Irish satire television series broadcast on RTÉ Two. It was created by John Ryan who also starred in the series.

Story and Plot
The fictitious newsroom in question is said to have been operating for four years and has claimed the accolade of best-dressed current-affairs team at the 2008 VIP Style Awards. Their leader Johnny Hansom is given his own identity. It is said that he was born Declan Foley and is an "increasingly unhinged" former DJ. Úna Óg Nic Ní Súillicáint is his beautiful new co-host who possesses an extraordinary mix of occasionally contradictory Irish language names. The entertainment correspondent is Jackie Byrne-Daly, the sports reporter is Trevor Corocran and the weatherman is Mike "Cloudy" Walsh.

Reception
Fears were expressed in the build-up to the launch of the show that it would be the subject of much criticism. RTÉ did not send out any advance tapes to the press

Reviews of the show were negative. John Boland of the Irish Independent, was unamused with the "lame delivery" and the lack of a good script. It also failed to generate any great public interest, and was watched by an exceptionally small numbers of viewers.

A show source was reported to have expressed the discomfort felt by the actors after encountering the newscasters, weather people and presenters they are parodying in the RTÉ canteen, with one such incident occurring in the corridor outside the studio directly after the professional in question was filmed for the first episode.

Complaints against the show were subsequently upheld by Ireland's Broadcasting Commission on the grounds of its poor taste in featuring terminally-ill children for comic effect.

The first programme attracted 89,000 viewers, according to RTÉ. The second programme led to a decrease in viewing figures to 76,000, and the viewership stayed very low for the remainder of the series.

Praise
One of the few people to praise the show was the former TV3 television presenter Lorraine Keane who was apparently parodied in it. She thought her character was "hilarious". The Evening Herald also noted the show's improvement towards the end of its run, believing that a few of the jokes in the final episode were "sharper than usual", and praised the "decent" idea of having Hansom copying "a Peter Finch-in-Network and getting the sack". (Of course, In Network the character played by Peter Finch does not end up getting the sack - but is actually assassinated.) The newspaper stated, in double-edged praise, that the funniest element in the entire programme was the brief, ticker-tape headlines rolling across the bottom of the screen, including the self-mocking joke by Ryan – "That loser who used to run a dog magazine".

References

External links
  (Archived)

2009 Irish television series debuts
Irish comedy television shows
Irish television news shows
RTÉ original programming
Television news sitcoms
2009 Irish television series endings